The Broad Highway is a novel published in 1910 by English author Jeffery Farnol.  Much of the novel is set in Sissinghurst, a small village South East England in Kent.

It was a best-seller, and the number one selling fiction book in the United States in 1911.

References

External links
 The Broad Highway full text at Project Gutenberg
 The Broad Highway full scan via Google Books

1910 British novels
Novels set in Kent
Novels by Jeffery Farnol